Ding Shisun (September 5, 1927 – October 12, 2019) was a Chinese mathematician, academic administrator, and politician. He served as president of Peking University during the 1989 Tiananmen Square protests and was forced to resign afterwards. He later served as chairman of the China Democratic League from 1996 to 2005 and a vice chairperson of the Standing Committee of the National People's Congress.

Early life
Ding was born on September 5, 1927 in Shanghai, Republic of China, to Ding Jiacheng and Liu Huixian, with his ancestral home in Zhenjiang, Jiangsu. He attended Utopia University in Shanghai from 1944 to 1947. A participant in anti-government student activities, he was arrested by the Kuomintang government and expelled by the university. As a result, he moved north to Beijing and entered Tsinghua University in 1948.

Early career 
Ding graduated from the Department of Mathematics of Tsinghua University in 1950, after the founding of the People's Republic of China, and was hired by the university as an assistant professor. In 1952, he transferred to Peking University, where he later rose to lecturer and professor.

During the Anti-Rightist Campaign in 1958, Ding sympathized with those denounced as "rightists". Although not labelled a rightist, he received administrative admonition and was expelled from the Communist Party of China in 1960. His membership was later restored. When the Cultural Revolution broke out in 1966, he was imprisoned and later sent to perform manual labour at a May Seventh Cadre School.

After the end of the Cultural Revolution in 1976, Ding was politically rehabilitated and appointed vice chair of the Department of Mathematics of Peking University. He was promoted to chairman in 1980.

President of Peking University 
In 1982, Ding resigned as mathematics chair and went to Harvard University as a visiting scholar. While he was away in the United States, Peking University ran a poll in 1983 among senior faculty members to select its next president, and Ding received the most votes.

In March 1984, Ding was appointed president of Peking University at the age of 57. As president, he implemented policies to reward faculty members who taught classes, especially foundational courses, withheld bonuses from those who did not teach, and dismissed those who could not teach or conduct significant research. As president, Ding continued to teach the foundational course of Advanced Algebra.

According to a report in Yanhuang Chunqiu, when Mao Xinyu, the grandson of Mao Zedong, graduated from high school in 1988, his mother Shao Hua tried to enroll him at Peking University. Ding rejected her request on the pretext that he could not guarantee Mao's safety among the liberal-minded students, and Mao ended up enrolling at Renmin University of China instead.

During his tenure, Ding promoted the spirit of "democracy and science", but some of his reforms were thwarted by the government. In 1988, he submitted his resignation to Education Minister Li Tieying, but Li declined the request. When the Tiananmen Square protests erupted in April 1989, students of Peking University played a leading role and Ding did not prevent them from joining the protests. After the Chinese government cracked down on the protests in June 1989, Ding was forced to resign in August 1989. He was replaced by Wu Shuqing, a vice president of Renmin University.

In an interview with China Central Television, Ding described his tenure as president a failure, and said that he failed to transform Peking University into the ideal university he had envisioned. However, the prominent scholar Ji Xianlin called Ding one of the two best presidents in the history of the university, together with Cai Yuanpei.

Later career 
On the invitation of Fei Xiaotong, chairman of the China Democratic League (CDL), Ding became a full-time vice chairman of the CDL in 1993, although he continued to teach freshman mathematics at Peking University.

In November 1996, Ding succeeded Fei as chairman of the CDL. He became a vice chairperson of the Standing Committee of the National People's Congress in 1998, serving two terms until 2008. In December 2005, Ding retired as chairman of CDL and became an honorary chairman.

Death
Ding died on October 12, 2019 in Beijing, aged 92. On October 17, he was buried in the Babaoshan Revolutionary Cemetery.

Personal life 
In 1956, Ding married , a faculty member in the chemistry department of Peking University. Their wedding was held on the university campus and attended by many students and teachers. They have two sons.

References

1927 births
2019 deaths
20th-century Chinese mathematicians
21st-century Chinese mathematicians
Chairpersons of the China Democratic League
Educators from Shanghai
Mathematicians from Shanghai
People's Republic of China politicians from Shanghai
Presidents of Peking University
Tsinghua University alumni
Academic staff of Tsinghua University
Utopia University alumni
Vice Chairpersons of the National People's Congress
Victims of the Cultural Revolution